Middle College High School at LaGuardia Community College (MCHS) is a public high school located on the campus of LaGuardia Community College in the Long Island City neighborhood in Queens, New York City, New York, United States. MCHS houses approximately 500 students in 45-35 Van Dam Street, the former L building of LaGuardia College's campus. It is a school within the New York City Department of Education. It is a member of the Middle College National Consortium.

About

Housed on the LaGuardia Community College campus and founded in 1974 as one of the city's first alternative high schools, Middle College is designed for students who would flounder in a traditional high school setting. It is recognized for its success in turning around at-risk students and is one of 209 schools that the chancellor exempted from the citywide uniform curriculum mandated in 2003. It is also one of 29 schools that the city Department of Education selected for a pilot program that grants schools more freedom in curriculum and budget matters if they adhere to higher standards.

Middle College offers a more collegiate and independent atmosphere than a typical high school. Helping students to blend in, rather than be set apart from the greater college environment. Middle College is a five-year, early college model where students take classes not only for high school but also for college credit at LaGuardia. After completing four years at Middle College, students can earn a diploma and at least 12 or more college credits. If they stay at the school for a fifth year, they can receive an associate's college degree as well.

As a member of the New York Performance Consortium, MCHS has a waiver from the city and state of New York for NY State Regents Exams. Students are only required to take and pass the NY State English Regents, another move away from traditional high-stakes testing. Under the waiver, students are required to create a portfolio of final projects from their classes during their time at MCHS. In 10th grade, students participate in a "Gateway Presentation". Students are mentored and must present a final project from 9th or 10th grade to a panel of students and teachers. In 12th grade, as a graduation requirement, students must do an "Oral Defense Presentation", in which they must present three projects to a panel of teachers. Students are given a faculty mentor as a senior in order to prepare for their presentation.

Classes run on 55-minute schedules, with eight periods per day. Half-days are granted on Wednesday where classes run on 40-minutes.  Students are given more autonomy than average high school students, where they are on an open campus. In addition, students and teachers are on first-name basis, creating for a casual learning environment.

Athletics

Middle College High School athletics is affiliated with International High School and Robert F. Wagner High School located in Long Island City, NY. All teams play under the Middle College High School banner in the Public School Athletic League (PSAL). The school offers participation in 13 sports during the school year.

University-affiliated schools in the United States
Public high schools in Queens, New York
Charter schools in New York City
Long Island City
1974 establishments in New York City
LaGuardia Community College